Murder in Colorado constitutes the intentional killing, under circumstances defined by law, of people within or under the jurisdiction of the U.S. state of Colorado.

The United States Centers for Disease Control and Prevention reported that in the year 2020, the state had a murder rate somewhat below the median for the entire country.

Felony murder rule

In Colorado, the common law felony murder rule has been codified in Colorado Revised Statutes § 18-3-103. As of September 15, 2021, the statute classifies a homicide as second degree murder when committed during one of these predicate felonies:
Committing or attempting to commit arson, robbery, burglary, kidnapping, sexual assault, or a class 3 felony sexual assault on a child
Or if in the course of one of these crimes or the immediate escape from it, anyone causes the death of a person other than one of the participants

Penalties

See also
 Law of Colorado

References

Murder in Colorado
Colorado law
U.S. state criminal law